

Introduction
Panicos Nicolaou is a Cypriot banker, who has been the Chief Executive Officer (CEO) of Cyprus’ biggest bank, the Bank of Cyprus, since 2019.

Background
He holds an MSc in Mechanical & Industrial engineering from the University of Illinois at Urbana-Champaign, USA and a BSc in Mechanical Engineering from the National Technical University of Athens (Metsovio). He also holds a BSc in Financial Services from the School of Management of The University of Manchester Institute of Science and Technology (UMIST), UK.

Career
Nicolaou joined the Bank in 2001, mainly holding positions within the Corporate Banking division. He served as Client Relations Officer and then as Manager of the Restructuring and Recoveries Division. In June 2016, he was promoted to Director of Corporate Banking, and was also appointed as a member of the Bank’s Board of Directors.

He was responsible for the supervision of the Bank’s Corporate Banking Centres throughout Cyprus, the International Corporate Banking Centre, and International Operations, as well as the Bank's Factoring unit. Under his supervision, the Bank’s Corporate Banking Division served over 2,500 corporate clients across key sectors of the economy.

He has been Bank Cyprus’ CEO since 2019, succeeding John Patrick Hourican, while he is an Executive Member of the Bank’s Board of Directors. Thanks to the Bank’s positive performance during his time as CEO, the Board of Directors decided to extend his term until December 2026.

Bank of Cyprus term
Bank of Cyprus achieved positive results with Panicos Nicolaou at its helm. Most importantly, during his term, the quality of the bank’s balance sheet improved due to several NPL portfolio sales, while its operating costs were reduced via a number of Voluntary Departure Schemes. Moreover, the bank managed to effectively handle the impact of the pandemic and completed its transition into the digital era.

2022 was an important year for Nicolaou’s term as CEO, as Bank of Cyprus significantly improved its profitability ratios. Specifically, the bank posted a profit after tax and before non-recurring items of €188m, while it reported a record year for new lending. New loans stood at €2.1b, up by 17% compared with last year, with the Bank following strict lending criteria. These positive developments were also reflected in the Bank’s share price, which has been on an uptrend recently.

The Bank’s even greater prospects as per its business plan, led investment fund Lone Star to make three non-binding proposals for the takeover of Bank of Cyprus in the summer of 2022. The Board of Directors unanimously rejected all three proposals, concluding that they undervalued the company and its prospects.

Other capacities
Nicolaou is Vice-Chairman of the Board of Directors of the Association of Cyprus Banks, and Chairman of the Board of Directors of the Bank of Cyprus Cultural Foundation.

References

Bank of Cyprus
Cypriot chief executives
National Technical University of Athens alumni
Grainger College of Engineering alumni
Alumni of the University of Manchester
Cypriot bankers
Year of birth missing (living people)
Living people